Entrust Corp., formerly Entrust Datacard, provides software and hardware used to issue financial cards, e-passport production, user authentication for those looking to access secure networks or conduct financial transactions,  trust certificated for websites, mobile credentials, and connected devices. The privately-held company is based in Shakopee, Minnesota and employs more than 2,500 people globally.

History

Entrust Inc
In 1994, Entrust built and sold the first commercially available public key infrastructure. In 1997, Nortel (formerly Northern Telecom) spun off Entrust when it became incorporated in Maryland as a part of a tax strategy. 

Entrust originally entered the public SSL market by chaining to the Thawte Root in 1999 creating Entrust.net.

In May 2000 Entrust acquired enCommerce, a provider of authentication and authorization technologies.

In April 2002, Entrust's public key infrastructure technology served as the foundation for the prototype of what is now the United States Federal Bridge Certification Authority. The authority is an element of the trust infrastructure that provides the basis for intergovernmental and cross-governmental secure communications.

In mid-2004, Entrust acquired AmikaNow! Corporation's content scanning, analysis and compliance technology. The technology is designed to automatically analyze and categorize email message and document content based on the contextual meaning, rather than pre-defined word lists. 

Entrust acquired Orion Security Solutions, a supplier of public key infrastructure services, in June 2006.

In July 2006, Entrust acquired Business Signatures Corporation, a supplier of non-invasive fraud detection solutions, for US$50 million. From a GAAP accounting perspective, the total purchase price was approximately $55.0 million, including assumed stock options, transaction expenses and net asset value. Business Signatures was founded in 2001 in Redwood City, California, by former executives from Oracle, HP and Cisco. It originally was funded by the Texas Pacific Group, Walden International, Ram Shriram of Google and Dave Roux of Silver Lake Partners. 

Prior to it becoming a private-equity company, Entrust was included on the Russell 3000 Index in July 2008. In July 2007, Entrust contributed public key infrastructure technology to the open-source community through Sun Microsystems, Inc. and the Mozilla Foundation. Specifically, Entrust supplied certificate revocation list distribution points (CRL-DP), Patent 5,699,431, to Sun under a royalty-free license for incorporation of that capability into the Mozilla open-source libraries.

In September 2008, Entrust participated in the ePassports EAC Conformity and Interoperability Tests in Prague, Czech Republic. Facilitated by a consortium of the European Commission, Brussels Interoperability Group (BIG) and the European Commission Joint Research Centre, the Prague tests allowed European countries to verify conformance of their second-generation ePassports containing fingerprint biometric data protected by Extended Access Control functions, commonly referred to as EAC. Additional testing included verification of crossover interoperability between EAC inspection systems and ePassports from different countries.

In July 2009, Entrust was acquired by Thoma Bravo, a U.S.-based private equity firm, for $124 million.

Datacard Group
The company was established in 1969 as Data Card Addressograph after Willis K. Drake acquired a Minnesota-based firm that produced credit card imprinters. Company founder Willis K. Drake led a team of engineers that invented machines that enabled secure and productive personalization of credit cards beyond the imprinters that Addressograph had offered. Datacard Group's high-volume card issuance systems allowed banks and retailers to personalize 1,500 cards per hour with great precision and security. Until the company launched its technologies, the process was slow and riddled with quality problems.

Under new ownership in the early 1990s, the company refined core technologies and expanded into additional markets, including government and enterprise. Shortly after the new owners purchased the company and took it private, development efforts were re-energized and core technologies quickly expanded beyond basic card embossing and magnetic stripe encoding. New inline card personalization technologies included color printing that rivaled lithographic output and encoding of both contact and contactless smart cards.

Development efforts led to multiple new offerings, including the world's first digital photo ID card system and desktop card printer in 1994. Until the launch of this new technology, governments, corporations and other security-minded enterprises primarily used cut-and-paste processes that involved laminating color photographs and paper identification cards. The digital systems brought new levels of security and economy to the identification process.

Through the 1990s and early 2000s, Data Card Corporation steadily grew revenues by expanding beyond hardware to include software and customized developments introducing driver's licenses, national IDs, traditional passports and e-passports (which elevated document security by incorporating biometrics, laser engraving, digital imaging, data encryption and other technologies). Significant revenue gains were also driven by continued leadership in the financial card market. Through the 1990s, 2000s and today, a vast majority of the world's credit, debit and prepaid cards are personalized using high-volume and desktop issuance systems.

In 2000, Datacard Group acquired Platform Seven (P7), the smart card technology arm of National Westminster Bank.

In 2010, the company also acquired Dynamic Card Systems (DCS) of Denver, Colorado. In addition to engineering and sales teams, the DCS acquisition included the card issuance software, CardWizard. Other acquisitions in recent years have expanded the company's core capabilities surrounding trusted identity and secure transactions including Safelayer and Trustis.

The company's products include high-volume central card issuance systems, including desktop printers, software and supplies. Other hardware products including high-value systems for issuing passports and creating customized mail packages for cards and other personalized credentials. Software offerings include products for issuing and managing financial cards, EMV smart cards, ID cards, passports, national IDs, student IDs and other credentials.

A rapidly growing portion of the company's portfolio is focused on instant issuance of credit, debit and prepaid cards. Banks, retailers, credit unions and other organizations issuing cards used for financial transactions are rapidly deploying systems used to issue cards on-demand in branch or store locations. These instant issuance systems are often used for issuing emergency replacements when cards are lost, stolen or compromised by breaches. Most often, they complement centralized operations that focus on mass issuance aspects of a card program.

The company also derives strong revenues from supplies and service. Supply offerings include overlays embedded with a variety of advanced technologies, including optical variable devices (OVDs), holographic images and various advanced materials that improve both the security and longevity of cards, passport booklets and other credentials. The company's service organization supports customers in 150 countries with a portfolio of both consultative professional services and technical support, which is available online, on-call or onsite. Service experts are often located onsite at large customer installations and develop highly collaborative relationships with in-house operations teams.

As of 2011 it was a privately held company.

In 2013 the company acquired Entrust Inc, and expanded its portfolio to include the Entrust public key infrastructure, certificate and software authentication platforms that strengthen security in a wide range of identity and transaction ecosystems.

Entrust Datacard
In 2014, Datacard Group rebranded as Entrust Datacard.

In June 2019 it acquired general-purpose Hardware Security Module vendor nCipher from Thales Group.

Entrust Corp
On September 14, 2020, the company announced that it has re-branded from Entrust Datacard to Entrust and changed its legal entity name to Entrust Corporation. The rebranding recognized the company's emphasis on secure identity, payments and data protection.

In January 2021, Entrust acquired HyTrust, Inc., a provider of virtualized and multi-cloud data encryption, key management, and cloud security posture management.

Today, the company offers a wide variety of digital security and credential issuance like crossing borders, making purchases, accessing e-government services or logging into corporate networks. The organization has expanded its offerings through a series of acquisitions, including hardware security module vendor nCipher (June 2019); HyTrust (January 2021), a provider to manage data security, current IT environments and emerging cloud infrastructures; and WorldReach Software (April 2021), which creates seamless traveler experiences through digital transformation of the ID process for immigration and border management.

Products
Examples of the company's diverse offerings include software and hardware used to issue financial cards, produce e-passports; authenticate users looking to access secure networks or conduct financial transactions; provide trusted certificates for websites, mobile credentials, and connected devices; and hardware security modules and software for secure encryption and key management. The privately held company is based in Minneapolis, Minnesota and employs more than 2,500 people globally.

Company leadership
Todd Wilkinson has served as Datacard Group (and now Entrust) president and CEO since June 2008. Previously, he had been the company's CFO for nearly three years and had worked in a number of executive positions at General Electric. Kurt Ishaug is the company's CFO and Lisa Tibbits is general counsel.
Kurt Ishaug is the company's CFO and Lisa Tibbits is general counsel.

References

Software companies based in Texas
Companies based in Dallas
Computer security software companies
Corporate spin-offs
Certificate authorities
2009 mergers and acquisitions
2013 mergers and acquisitions
Software companies of the United States
Electronics companies established in 1969
Technology companies established in 1969